Clarksboro may refer to:

Clarksboro, Georgia
Clarksboro, New Jersey